The Darling of Paris is a 1917 American silent romantic drama film directed by J. Gordon Edwards and starring Theda Bara and Glen White. It was a very loose film adaptation of the 1831 novel The Hunchback of Notre-Dame by Victor Hugo.  It was produced by William Fox. The Darling of Paris was later re-edited from six to five reels and re-released by Fox on February 16, 1919. The film is now considered lost.

Plot
The wealthy girl Esmeralda (Theda Bara) is kidnapped by gypsies at birth and becomes, as one might assume, the darling of Paris. She is loved by the bell ringer and former hunchback Quasimodo (Glen White), Frollo (Walter Law), the wicked surgeon who cares for him, and an equally wicked Captain Phoebus (Herbert Heyes).

However, the titular hunchback is downplayed in favor of gypsy dancing girl Esmerelda. The surgeon kills the Captain and frames Esmeralda, but after many merry mix-ups, she winds back with her wealthy family, happily wed to Quasimodo.

Cast

Production notes
The film was shot at the Fox Studios then located in Fort Lee, New Jersey. An elaborate set was constructed on the back lot to recreate Paris where the film is set. The set also included a reproduction of the Notre Dame de Paris.

Brazil
The release in Brazil was done with the title A Favorita de Paris on September 17, 1917, on the cinemas Ideal and Pathé, both from Rua da Carioca 60–62, Rio de Janeiro. It also debuted on Cine Haddock Lobo on September 30, 1917. Cinema Haddock Lobo was located near the Largo da Segunda-Feira, in a street of several theaters. Cine Ideal belonged to the group Severiano Ribeiro, which still holds in its storehouse old silent films. For over a month it grossed a huge box office and was a success of public and critical acclamation on Rio society.

The highest-grossing releases in September on Rio:

See also
List of lost films

References

External links

 
The Darling of Paris at SilentEra
 
Theatrical lobby poster

1917 films
1910s historical romance films
1917 romantic drama films
Fox Film films
American romantic drama films
American silent feature films
American black-and-white films
Films based on The Hunchback of Notre-Dame
Films directed by J. Gordon Edwards
Films set in Paris
Films set in religious buildings and structures
Films set in the 1480s
Films shot in Fort Lee, New Jersey
Lost American films
American historical romance films
1917 lost films
Lost romantic drama films
Films about Romani people
1910s American films
Silent romantic drama films
Silent horror films
Silent American drama films
1910s English-language films